Finsland is a former municipality in the old Vest-Agder county, Norway. The  municipality existed from 1838 until its dissolution in 1964.  The administrative centre was the village of Finsland where Finsland Church is located.  The municipality generally encompassed the northern part of the present-day municipality of Kristiansand in what is now Agder county.

History
The parish of Finsland was established as a municipality on 1 January 1838 (see formannskapsdistrikt law). During the 1960s, there were many municipal mergers across Norway due to the work of the Schei Committee. On 1 January 1964, Finsland municipality was dissolved and its lands split between two municipalities. The small area of Finsland near Kleveland bru (population: 34) was transferred to the neighboring Marnardal municipality and the rest of Finsland (population: 797) was merged with the municipality of Greipstad (population: 2,061) and the Eikeland area of Øvrebø (population: 39) to form the new municipality of Songdalen. Prior to the merger, the population of Finsland was 831.

Name
The municipality (originally the parish) was named Finsland, after the old "Finsland" farm which is where the Finsland Church is located.  The farm is situated by the river Finnsåna, which flows into the river Mandalselva. There are also farms nearby called Finsdal and Finsådal. The first element is the word finne means "wilderness" or "remote".  The second element land is the same as the word for "land".

Government
All municipalities in Norway, including Finsland, are responsible for primary education (through 10th grade), outpatient health services, senior citizen services, unemployment and other social services, zoning, economic development, and municipal roads.  The municipality was governed by a municipal council of elected representatives, which in turn elected a mayor.

Municipal council
The municipal council  of Finsland was made up of representatives that were elected to four year terms.  The party breakdown of the final municipal council was as follows:

See also
List of former municipalities of Norway

References

External links
1960 census and map of Finsland 

Songdalen
Former municipalities of Norway
1838 establishments in Norway
1964 disestablishments in Norway